Ezra 1 is the first chapter of the Book of Ezra in the Old Testament of the Christian Bible, or the book of Ezra–Nehemiah in the Hebrew Bible, which treats the book of Ezra and book of Nehemiah as one book. Jewish tradition states that Ezra is the author of Ezra-Nehemiah as well as the Book of Chronicles, but modern scholars generally believe that a compiler from the 5th century BCE (the so-called "Chronicler") is the final author of these books.

Ezra 1 contains a narrative of the Edict of Cyrus and the initial return of exiles to Judah led by Sheshbazzar as well as the restoration of the sacred temple vessels. It also introduces the section comprising chapters 1 to 6 describing the history before the arrival of Ezra in the land of Judah  in 468 BCE. The opening sentence of this chapter (and this book) is identical to the final sentence of 2 Chronicles.

Cyrus Cylinder
The Cyrus Cylinder contains a statement related to the Cyrus's edict which gives the historical background to the Book of Ezra:

Cyrus's edict is significant to the return of the Jews, because it shows that they did not slip away from Babylon but were given official permission by the Persian king in the first year of his rule, and it is a specific fulfillment of the seventy years prophecy of Jeremiah.

Text

The text is written in Biblical Hebrew and divided into 11 verses.

Textual witnesses
There is a translation into Koine Greek known as the Septuagint, made in the last few centuries BCE. Extant ancient manuscripts of the Septuagint version include Codex Vaticanus (B; B; 4th century), and Codex Alexandrinus (A; A; 5th century).

An ancient Greek book called 1 Esdras (Greek: Ἔσδρας Αʹ) containing some parts of 2 Chronicles, Ezra and Nehemiah is included in most editions of the Septuagint and is placed before the single book of Ezra–Nehemiah (which is titled in Greek: Ἔσδρας Βʹ). 1 Esdras 2:1-14 is an equivalent of Ezra 1:1-11 (Cyrus's edict).

An early manuscript containing the text of this chapter in Biblical Hebrew is the Codex Leningradensis (1008 CE). Since the anti-Jewish riots in Aleppo in 1947, the whole book of Ezra-Nehemiah has been missing from the text of the Aleppo Codex.

Biblical narrative

Ezra 1 starts by providing historical context of a real event: "the first year of Cyrus king of Persia", but immediately follows with the statement about Yahweh, who has the real control and even already speaks about this event before the birth of Cyrus (Isaiah 44:28; 45:13) and the fulfillment of his word through Jeremiah.

Verse 1

Verse 2

Verse 3

Verse 4
{{blockquote|And whoever is left in any place where he dwells, let the men of his place help him with silver and gold, with goods and livestock, besides the freewill offerings for the house of God which is in Jerusalem.}}

Verse 7

The Temple treasures that Nebuchadnezzar took away are now to be returned to Jerusalem.

See also
 Cyrus the Great in the Bible
 Jerusalem
 Mithredath
 Zerubbabel
Related Bible parts: 2 Chronicles 36, Isaiah 44, Isaiah 45, Jeremiah 25, Jeremiah 29, Jeremiah 51

Notes

References

Sources
 
 
 
 
 
 Brosius, Maria (ed.): The Persian Empire from Cyrus II to Artaxerxes I'' (2000, London Association of Classical Teachers (LACT) 16, London.

External links
 Jewish translations:
 Ezra - Chapter 1 (Judaica Press) translation [with Rashi's commentary] at Chabad.org
 Christian translations:
 Online Bible at GospelHall.org (ESV, KJV, Darby, American Standard Version, Bible in Basic English)
 Book of Ezra Chapter 1. Bible Gateway

01